The Ainulindalë ("Music of the Ainur") is the creation account in J. R. R. Tolkien's legendarium, published posthumously as the first part of The Silmarillion in 1977.  The "Ainulindalë" sets out a central part of the cosmology of Tolkien's legendarium, telling how the Ainur, a class of angelic beings, perform a great music prefiguring the creation of the material universe, Eä, including Middle-Earth.
The creator Eru Ilúvatar introduces the theme of the sentient races of Elves and Men, not anticipated by the Ainur, and gives physical being to the prefigured universe. Some of the Ainur decide to enter the physical world to prepare for their arrival, becoming the Valar and Maiar.

Tolkien wrote the initial version of the "Ainulindalë" between November 1919 and the spring of 1920 as "Music of the Ainur", and then completely rewrote it in 1930. He continued to make further revisions throughout his life. The early version was eventually published by his son Christopher in The Book of Lost Tales 1.

Context

J. R. R. Tolkien was an English author and philologist of ancient Germanic languages, specialising in Old English, and a devout Roman Catholic; he spent much of his career as a professor at the University of Oxford. He is best known for his novels about his invented Middle-earth, The Hobbit and The Lord of the Rings. He described The Lord of the Rings as "a fundamentally religious and Catholic work", rich in Christian symbolism. He however spent much of his life working on his Middle-earth legendarium, which remained unpublished in his lifetime. That large body of stories was edited after his death by his son Christopher, initially in 1977 as a single text, The Silmarillion, containing a version of the Ainulindalë. That was followed, between 1983 and 1996, by the twelve volumes of The History of Middle-earth, which revealed and annotated the many drafts of the overlapping stories of the legendarium,  including other versions of the Ainulindalë.

Synopsis

The "Ainulindalë" recounts the creation of Arda by the deity Eru Ilúvatar. The story begins with a description of the Ainur as "children of Ilúvatar's thought". They are taught the art of music, which becomes the subject of their immortal lives. The Ainur sing alone or in small groups about themes given to each of them by Ilúvatar, who proposes a "great" plan for them all: a collaborative symphony where they would sing together in harmony. Although the Ainur embody Ilúvatar's thoughts, they are expected to use their freedom to assist the development of the "great" plan.

The most powerful of the Ainur, Melkor, is introduced to the music. Although his "loud, and vain" music disrupts the harmony, Ilúvatar stands, smiles and raises his left hand to begin a new theme. When Melkor again spoils the second theme, Ilúvatar rises sternly and raises his right hand to begin a third. Melkor tries to corrupt this theme with the volume of his music, but it is powerful enough to prevent him from succeeding. Ilúvatar ends the music, chastises Melkor and leaves the Ainur to their thoughts.

The deity takes the Ainur to see how music, at the end of the Void, created Arda. When the third theme results in the arrival of the Children of Ilúvatar, the Elves and the Men, many Ainur want to go into the world to visit them. Although Melkor was the first of the Ainur to be named, Ulmo was the first to take action in Arda. Despite Melkor's efforts, Ulmo's water cannot be ruined by heat or cold; he and Manwë are revealed as the primary agents of Ilúvatar's plans.

Some Ainur remain in the Timeless Halls with Ilúvatar, and others go into Arda as the Valar and Maiar. The Ainur begin to prepare for the arrival of the Children of Ilúvatar; Melkor repeatedly thwarts their preparations, desiring to rule Arda. Manwë summons the Ainur to resist Melkor, who retreats. When the Valar later assume bodily form, the first war of Eä begins, but Manwë's efforts make the Earth habitable for Elves and Men.

Writing

Tolkien initially intended the "Ainulindalë" ("The Music of the Ainur") to be part of The Book of Lost Tales, which he wrote in the 1910s and 1920s. In a letter to Christopher Bretherton, dated 16 July 1964, Tolkien stated that he had written the first version of the "Ainulindalë" between November 1918 and the spring of 1920, while he was working on the Oxford English Dictionary.

The first draft of the story, written in pencil, does not vary significantly from the published version; future changes involved the addition of Manwë and Aulë. The narrator in the earlier version is the elf Rúmil of Tirion and the language differs from that of the Silmarillion version. "Melkor" is spelt "Melko", and Ilúvatar weeps before he creates the third theme. At the end is a section about the Valar, which was later moved to the "Valaquenta".

Tolkien abandoned the Ainulindalë for many years. Although it did not appear in the "Sketch of the Mythology", in which he summarised his legendarium in 1926, the subject was briefly mentioned in "Annals of Valinor" and "Quenta Silmarillion". Tolkien rewrote "The Music of the Ainur" during the 1930s, leaving most of its storyline intact.

In 1946, while he was drafting The Lord of the Rings, Tolkien wrote a new version of the "Ainulindalë" of which only half a torn page survives. His legendarium then changed radically, so that Arda had always existed, the Sun existed when the world was formed, and the Moon was formed as a result of Melkor's destruction. Tolkien's concept of the Lamps of the Valar was abandoned in favour of a more coherent creation myth, with scientific elements. The idea of a spherical world was abandoned after a reader said that she preferred a flat one.

In 1948 Tolkien began a new version, eliminating mentions of the Sun and the Moon, and introducing the concept that Ilúvatar created the world after the visions of the Ainur died away. In this version, which added several new details, the story is framed by a fictional narrator, the elf Pengoloð.

Analysis

The "Ainulindalë", written early in Tolkien's career, demonstrates the importance of music in his legendarium. According to John Gardner, "Music is the central symbol and the total myth of The Silmarillion, a symbol that becomes interchangeable with light (music's projection)." The scholar Verlyn Flieger, too, stresses the pervasive themes of music and light from the creation onwards.

"The Music of the Ainur", as it appears in The Book of Lost Tales, is based on Norse mythology. Like Hesiod's Theogony or the Gylfaginning in the Prose Edda, it answers questions of cosmogony, and story's style has been compared to that of old Norse texts. Although the wording differs substantially, the Valar and the Æsir are alike in influencing the world and being influenced by their actions; Manwë has been compared to Odin in this context.

Despite the story's Norse pagan elements, such as the Ainur performing the creative work of Ilúvatar, other aspects of the "Ainulindalë" reflect Tolkien's Catholicism. His pre-Christian story has been called "Tolkien's Genesis essay"; according to another source, "The Biblical parallels evinced by the creation account of the Ainulindalë ... are inescapable."

The Tolkien scholar Marjorie Burns, who studied the different versions of the "Ainulindalë", said that Tolkien increasingly Christianised the Valar and reduced the influence of Norse mythology in successive revisions. In the story, Tolkien expresses a global view of Christianity, with good and evil parallelling the stories in the Book of Genesis. As Tolkien has Elrond say in "The Council of Elrond" in The Lord of the Rings, "For nothing is evil in the beginning. Even Sauron was not so." In the "Ainulindalë", Ilúvatar creates everything good; evil intrudes later. Though evil is brought about in the creation song by Melkor's pride, Ilúvatar incorporates it into the conclusion of his divine plan. The theme of evil being a perversion of good correlates to Christian theology regarding the existence of evil in a world made by a benevolent creator. Even Melkor's pride is Eru's will. As Eru himself declares "no theme may be played that hath not its uttermost source in me, nor can any alter the music in my despite".

Reception and legacy

Although commentary on The Silmarillion has primarily focused on the work as a whole, the reaction to the "Ainulindalë" has been generally positive. Joseph Pearce, a Roman Catholic commentator, called it "the most important part of The Silmarillion" and said, "The myth of creation is perhaps the most significant and most beautiful of Tolkien's works." The scholar of humanities Brian Rosebury considered the "Ainulindalë" a success, with "appropriately 'scriptural'" prose. Several Jesuits have praised the story; James V. Schall said, "I have never read anything as beautiful as the first page of The Silmarillion" and Robert Murray said, "In all literature, from the formation of the sacred books of humanity, it is very difficult to find a comparable mythological story of creation by its beauty and imaginative power."

According to Fantasy Literature: A Core Collection and Reference Guide, "Every part of [The Silmarillion] benefits from the power and audacity of imaginative genius Tolkien and his brilliant style" and the "Ainulindalë" has "organ tones". Although Ralph C. Wood called it "one of the finest and most original of [Tolkien's] writings", the stylistic differences between this story and the rest of The Silmarillion have been the subject of debate.

The American opera singer Adam C. J. Klein composed an opera, Leithian, based on The Silmarillion, while the American contemporary classical composer Frank Felice wrote an orchestral version of the "Ainulindalë". According to the Tolkien scholar Colin Duriez, the "Ainulindalë" may have inspired C. S. Lewis to have his fictional world of Narnia created from a song.

References

Primary
This list identifies each item's location in Tolkien's writings.

Secondary

Sources 

 
 
  
 
 
 
 
 
 
 
 
 
 
 
 
 
 
 
          
  
 
 
 
 
 
 

Fictional creation stories
Middle-earth music
Middle-earth theology
The Silmarillion